Lhotse (lho tse) is the fourth highest mountain in the world at , after Mount Everest, K2, and Kangchenjunga. The main summit is on the border between Tibet Autonomous Region of China and the Khumbu region of Nepal.

With Everest to the north and Nuptse to the west, Lhotse forms the apex of the massive horseshoe-shaped arc of the Everest massif. Despite the tremendous vertical relief of its South and Northeast Faces, it is the least prominent of the eight-thousanders due to the great height of the South Col between it and Everest. Lhotse's Western Face, recessed behind the head of the Khumbu Glacier in the Western Cwm, plays an integral part in the standard routes of ascent for both peaks; the name Lhotse, which means "South Peak" in Tibetan, further emphasizes the close relationship between the two.

Though Lhotse Main is considered to be an intermediately difficult eight-thousander when ascended from the standard Reiss Couloir route, its secondary summits and extremely steep South Face are regarded as some of the most difficult and dangerous climbs in the world. Its icy Northeastern Face remains unclimbed.

Climbing
An early attempt on Lhotse was by the 1955 International Himalayan Expedition, headed by Norman Dyhrenfurth. It also included two Austrians (cartographer Erwin Schneider and Ernst Senn) and two Swiss (Bruno Spirig and Arthur Spöhel), and was the first expedition in the Everest area to include Americans (Fred Beckey, George Bell, and Richard McGowan). The Nepalese liaison officer was Gaya Nanda Vaidya. They were accompanied by 200 local porters and several climbing Sherpas. They were beaten back by unexpectedly strong wind and low temperatures. Under Schneider's direction, they completed the first map of the Everest area (1:50,000 photogrammetric). The expedition also made several short films covering local cultural topics and made a number of first ascents of smaller peaks in the Khumbu region.

The main summit of Lhotse was first climbed on 18 May 1956, by the Swiss team of Ernst Reiss and Fritz Luchsinger, members of the Swiss Mount Everest/Lhotse Expedition.

On 12 May 1970, Sepp Mayerl and Rolf Walter of Austria made the first ascent of Lhotse Shar.

Lhotse Middle remained, for a long time, the highest unclimbed named point on Earth; its first ascent was made on 23 May 2001 by Eugeny Vinogradsky, Sergei Timofeev, Alexei Bolotov and Petr Kuznetsov of a Russian expedition.

The Lhotse standard climbing route follows the same path as Everest's South Col route up to the Yellow Band beyond Camp 3. After the Yellow Band, the routes diverge with climbers bound for Everest taking a left over the Geneva Spur up to the South Col, while Lhotse climbers take a right further up the Lhotse face. The last part to the summit leads through the narrow "Reiss couloir" until the Lhotse main peak is reached.

By December 2008, 371 climbers had summited Lhotse while 20 had died during their attempt. Lhotse was not summited in 2014, 2015, or 2016 due to a series of incidents. It was next summited in May 2017.

Timeline
 1955 Attempt by the International Himalayan Expedition.
 1956 May 18 First ascent of the main summit: Fritz Luchsinger and Ernst Reiss.
 1965 First attempt on Lhotse Shar by a Japanese expedition – reached .
 1970 May 12 First ascent of Lhotse Shar by an Austrian expedition, Sepp Mayerl, Rolf Walter.
 1973 First attempt on the South Face by a Japanese expedition led by Ryohei Uchida.
 1974 December 25 First attempt of an 8,000-meter peak in winter.
 1975 Attempt on the South Face by Reinhold Messner.
 1977 Second ascent of the main summit by a German expedition led by Dr. G. Schmatz.
 1979 Ascent of the main summit by Andrzej Czok and Jerzy Kukuczka without the use of supplemental oxygen (Kukuczka's first conquered eight-thousander, and eventually the last one to climb 10 years later). Ascent was in company of Zygmunt Andrzej Heinrich and Janusz Skorek. 4 days later second group climbed to the peak - Janusz Baranek, Adam Bilczewski, Stanisław Cholewa, Robert Niklas. Leszek Czarnecki, climbed with the group without the use of supplemental oxygen, but carrying the oxygen to elevation of 8350 m, where he was forced to turn back due to inclement weather.
 1981 Attempt on the South Face by a Yugoslavian expedition led by Aleš Kunaver. Vanja Matijevec and Franček Knez reach the top of the Face but not the summit.
 1981 April 30 First solo ascent without the use of supplement oxygen of the main summit by Hristo Prodanov, as part of the first Bulgarian Himalayan expedition.
 1981 October 16 Second ascent of Lhotse Shar, Colin Molines
 1984 May 20/21 Members of the Czechoslovak expedition led by Ivan Galfy climb the South Face of Lhotse Shar for the first time (third overall ascent of Lhotse Shar).
 1986 October 16 Ascent by Reinhold Messner, thus becoming the first person to climb all of the fourteen eight-thousanders.
 1987 May 21 the Brazilian Otto William Gerstenberger Junior and the Swiss Haans Singera reach the summit.
 1988 December 31 Krzysztof Wielicki, a Polish climber, completed the first winter ascent of Lhotse.
 1989 October 24 Jerzy Kukuczka perishes while climbing the South Face when his secondhand rope breaks. An international expedition led by Reinhold Messner to climb the South Face was unsuccessful.
 1990 April 24 Tomo Česen from Slovenia, makes a first solo ascent of the South Face of Lhotse. Controversy of his climb is later raised by the Soviet Himalayan expedition, claiming that his ascent would be impossible. Reinhold Messner would also raise his doubts.
 1990 October 16 First ascent of South Face by the Soviet Himalayan expedition members Sergey Bershov and Gennadiy Karataev.
 1994 May 13 Carlos Carsolio got mountaintop solo, introducing a world speed record at 23 h 50 min rise from Base Camp to the summit.
 1996 May 10 Chantal Mauduit becomes the first woman to reach the summit of Lhotse.
 1996 May 17 Anatoli Boukreev solo ascent, world speed record at 21 hours 16 min from Base Camp to summit without supplemental oxygen; he had summited Everest the week before.
 1997 Attempt to climb Lhotse Middle via the ridge between the main summit and Lhotse Shar by a Russian expedition, led by Vladimir Bashkirov, who died in the attempt, just below the main summit.
 1999 Attempt to climb Lhotse Middle and traverse the three summits by a Russian team, failed due to bad weather.
 2001 May 23 First ascent of Lhotse Middle by a Russian expedition.
 2007 Pemba Doma Sherpa, Nepali mountaineer and two-time summiter of Mount Everest, falls to her death from Lhotse at 8000 m
 2011 May 14–15, Michael Horst, American guide, summits Mount Everest and Lhotse without descending below Camp IV (South Col) with less than 21 hours elapsing between the two summits.
 2011 on 20 May, Indian mountaineer Arjun Vajpai became the youngest climber ever to summit Lhotse, aged 17 years, 11 months and 16 days.
 2017 on 19 May, Belgian Stef 'Wolf' Wolfsput became the first person with a disability to climb to the summit of Lhotse and only the second Belgian. He suffers a paralysed leg.
 2018 on 22 May, Mexican climber José Luis Sánchez Fernández became the first Latin American to summit both Mount Everest and Lhotse in less than 24 hours.
2018 on 30 September, Hilaree Nelson and Jim Morrison complete the first ski descent from the summit of Lhotse.

Lhotse Face

The western flank of Lhotse is known as the Lhotse Face. Any climber bound for the South Col on Everest must climb this  wall of glacial blue ice. This face rises at 40 and 50-degree pitches with the occasional 80-degree bulges. High-altitude climbing Sherpas and the lead climbers will set fixed ropes up this wall of ice. Climbers and porters need to establish a good rhythm of foot placement and pulling themselves up the ropes using their jumars. Two rocky sections called the Yellow Band and the Geneva Spur interrupt the icy ascent on the upper part of the face.

On 19 May 2016, a high-altitude mountain worker, Ang Furba Sherpa, died when he slipped and fell down the Lhotse face.

From Gokyo Ri

See also
Lhotse Shar Glacier

Notes

References

Further reading

A. Arnette : Lhotse gaining attention (2014)
E. Morgan: Lhotse South Face – The Wall of Legends (2016)

External links

 Lhotse page on Himalaya-Info.org (German)
 Lhotse page on Summitpost
 
 
 Ascents and fatalities statistics

Mountains of Tibet
Eight-thousanders of the Himalayas
China–Nepal border
International mountains of Asia
Mountains of Koshi Province